St. Dunstan's College is an Anglican private school in the Diocese of the Highveld in Benoni, Gauteng.

References

External links 

Boarding schools in South Africa